Leanna Carriere-Wellwood (born 3 April 1985) is a Canadian pole vaulter and heptathlete.

After suffering a shoulder injury she turned to the heptathlon instead and placed seventeenth at the 2014 Pan American Combined Events Cup with a total of 5006 points – a new personal best.

References

External links
Official website

1985 births
Living people
Canadian female pole vaulters
Canadian heptathletes
Place of birth missing (living people)